Isaac Galloway IV (born October 10, 1989) is an American former professional baseball outfielder. He has previously played in Major League Baseball (MLB) for the Miami Marlins.

Career
Galloway attended Los Osos High School in Rancho Cucamonga, California, where he was teammates on the school's baseball team with Addison Reed. Galloway initially committed to play college baseball at San Diego State, but signed with the Florida Marlins after being taken in the 8th round of the 2008 MLB Draft. 

He logged 3,655 plate appearances, 947 games, and 11 seasons in the minors. He was called up to the majors for the first time on July 31, 2018. Galloway had the most minor league service time of any player to make his Major League debut with the Marlins since Brian Daubach's debut 20 years earlier. 

On February 4, 2019, Galloway was designated for assignment following the waiver claim of Austin Brice and outrighted on February 10. He was assigned to Triple-A to start the 2019 season. On April 16, his contract was purchased and he was recalled to the major league roster. Galloway elected free agency on October 1, 2019.

References

External links

1989 births
Living people
People from Rancho Cucamonga, California
Sportspeople from San Bernardino County, California
Baseball players from California
Major League Baseball outfielders
Miami Marlins players
Gulf Coast Marlins players
Greensboro Grasshoppers players
Jupiter Hammerheads players
Jacksonville Suns players
Jacksonville Jumbo Shrimp players
New Orleans Zephyrs players
New Orleans Baby Cakes players